The Shadow Ministry of Brendan Nelson was the opposition Coalition shadow ministry of Australia from December 2007 to September 2008, opposing Kevin Rudd's Australian Labor Party ministry.

The shadow cabinet is a group of senior Opposition spokespeople who form an alternative Cabinet to the government's, whose members "shadow" or "mark" each individual Minister or portfolio of the Government.

Following the Labor Party's win, in the 2007 federal election, the Liberal-National Coalition became the official Opposition. Brendan Nelson was elected Leader of the Liberal Party on 29 November 2007 and announced that his deputy Julie Bishop would be Shadow Minister for Workplace Relations and that his unsuccessful rival for the Liberal leadership, Malcolm Turnbull, would be offered the position of Shadow Treasurer. Warren Truss was elected leader of the National Party. The composition of the remainder of the shadow cabinet was announced on 6 December 2007. Nelson's Cabinet lasted until 16 September 2008, following a leadership spill, which saw Turnbull emerge as the new leader.

Members of the Shadow Cabinet (2007–2008)

Members of the Outer Shadow Ministry (2007–2008)

Shadow Parliamentary Secretaries (2007–2008)

See also
 First Rudd Ministry
 Fourth Howard Ministry

References

External links
 Parliament of Australia, Official current Shadow Ministry list. Retrieved January 2008

Liberal Party of Australia
Australia, Shadow Cabinet
Political history of Australia
Opposition of Australia
Nelson